is a Japanese voice actress who works for Aoni Production.

Filmography

Television animation
Saint Seiya (1986), Seiya (Young), Kiki
Dragon Ball (1987), Chiaotzu
Dragon Ball Z (1989), Chiaotzu, Bulma's Mother, Idasa's Mother
Dragon Quest: Legend of the Hero Abel (1989), Minea
Dragon Quest: The Adventure of Dai (1991), Piroro, Nabara
Sailor Moon (1992), Balm, Garoben, Kazuko Tadashita
Marmalade Boy (1994), Chiyako
Sailor Moon S (1994), Hurdler (Daimon)
GeGeGe no Kitaro (1996), Sunakake Baba
Ojarumaru (2001), Taruko
Dragon Ball Kai (2009), Chiaotzu
One Piece (2013), Jora
Dragon Ball Super (2015), Chiaotzu

Unknown date
Kamen no Ninja Akakage as Shōta
Blue Comet SPT Layzner as Anna Stephanie
BS Tantei Club: Yuki ni Kieta Kako as Toshie, Sachi Tachibana
Chibi Maruko-chan as Oyone
Domain of Murder as Keita Toyama
Dr Slump as Aoi Kimidori
Galaxy High as Aimee Brightower
G Gundam as Gina
High School! Kimengumi as Maki Hidari
Himitsu no Akko-chan as Kenta, Frog
Kabuki Klash as Tsunade
Kiteretsu Daihyakka as Osugi, Tsutomu
Nintama Rantarō as Danzo Kato, Heidayū Sasayama, Tomomi, Nintama, Hemuhemu (young)
Zatch Bell! as Yopopo
Rumiko Takahashi Anthology as Risa Hoshino
Sally, the Witch as Tetsuo Araki
Samurai Aces and Sengoku Blade: Sengoku Ace Episode II as Miko (Koyori)
Shounen Ashibe as Shinichi Sakata, Mayumi
Valkyrie Profile & Valkyrie Profile: Lenneth as Yumeru, Celia
Wonder Beat Scramble as Bio
Wing-Man as Yukari

Original video animation (OVA)
Fight! Iczer One (1985), Cobalt
Legend of the Galactic Heroes (1988), Emperor Erwin Josef II
Slow Step (1991), Ayako Sawamura
Armitage III (1995), Bronski

Theatrical animation
Dragon Ball: Mystical Adventure (1988), Chiaotzu
Little Nemo: Adventures in Slumberland (1989), Oompy
Dragon Ball Z: The Tree of Might (1990), Chiaotzu
Dragon Ball Z: Bojack Unbound (1993), Chiaotzu
Dragon Ball Z: Battle of Gods (2013), Chiaotzu

Video games
Urusei Yatsura: Stay with You (1990)
Tenshi no Uta (1991), Clair
Ys IV: The Dawn of Ys (1993), Aria
Makeruna! Makendō 2: Kimero Youkai Souri (1995; PlayStation version), Mamarin
Another Century's Episode (2005), Anna Stephanie
Shining Hearts (2010), Madera Magus
Digimon Story: Cyber Sleuth (2015), Jesmon

Dubbing
Thomas the Tank Engine & Friends (1995-1998), Caroline the Car

External links
 
 

1961 births
Living people
Japanese voice actresses
Voice actresses from Saitama Prefecture
Aoni Production voice actors